The Midland Regional Hospital, Mullingar is a public hospital at Mullingar in County Westmeath, Ireland. It is managed by Ireland East Hospital Group.

History
The hospital was officially opened by Seán T. O'Kelly, Minister of Local Government and Public Health, as Westmeath County Hospital on 27 April 1936. It evolved to become the General Hospital, Mullingar and benefited from major extensions which opened in 1988 and 1994. In June 2010 some 4,000 people protested in Mullingar, concerned about the future of the hospital.

Services
The hospital provides 204 beds and 6 critical care beds.

See also
 Midland Regional Hospital, Portlaoise
 Midland Regional Hospital, Tullamore

References

External links

Buildings and structures in Mullingar
Health Service Executive hospitals
Hospitals in County Westmeath
Hospital buildings completed in 1936
Hospitals established in 1936
1936 establishments in Ireland
20th-century architecture in the Republic of Ireland